Anning may refer to:

Places
Anning, Yunnan (安宁市) city, China
Anning District (安宁区), Lanzhou prefecture, Gansu, China

People
Anning (name)